is a Japanese voice actress, singer and narrator who worked for Aoni Production, but now as of January, 2021 a Freelancer.

Biography
Asano was born on August 25, 1977 in Noshiro, Akita and studied at the Kokugakuin University Faculty of Literature. Asano announced via her blog that her dōjin manga series Seiyu's Life!, with art by Kenjiro Hata, is receiving an anime television series adaptation.

Filmography

Television animation
A Little Snow Fairy Sugar (2001) – Saga
.hack//Sign (2002, Episode 28: "Unison") – BlackRose (Hayami Akira)
Gravion (2002) – Kaori Stephanie
Haibane Renmei (2002) – Shouta
Rizelmine (2002) – Aoi
Spiral: The Bonds of Reasoning (2002) – Hiyono Yuizaki
D.N.Angel (2003) – Risa Harada
Ikki Tousen (2003) – Hakufu Sonsaku
Popotan (2003) – Mai
Gravion Zwei (2004) – Kaori Stephanie
Uta∽Kata (2004) – Manatsu Kuroki
Daphne in the Brilliant Blue (2004) – Gloria
Yumeria (2004) – Mizuki
Melody of Oblivion (2004) - Sayoko Tsukinomori 
He Is My Master (2005) – Izumi
Hell Girl (2005) – Mina Minato (Episode 15)
Mahoraba ~Heartful days~ (2005) – Megumi Momono
Shakugan no Shana (2005) – Yukari Hirai
SoltyRei (2005) – Rose Anderson
High School Girls (2006) – Yuma Suzuki
Otome wa Boku ni Koishiteru (2006) – Mariya Mikado
Tokimeki Memorial Only Love (2006) – Naomi Hoshina
Dōjin Work (2007) – Najimi Osana
Hayate the Combat Butler (2007) – Risa Asakaze
Prism Ark (2007) – Princea
Ikki Tousen: Dragon Destiny (2007) – Hakufu Sonsaku
Monochrome Factor (2008) – Aya Suzuno
Ikki Tousen: Great Guardians (2008) – Hakufu Sonsaku
One Piece (2009) – Marguerite 
Strike Witches 2 (2010) – Junko Takei
Ikki Tousen: Xtreme Xecutor (2010) – Hakufu Sonsaku
Yumekui Merry (2011) – Nao Horie
Blood-C (2011) – Yūka Amino
Beelzebub (2011) – Pillar Agiel
Hyouka (2012) – Ayako Kouchi
Aikatsu! (2013) – Saki Hashiba
Blood Lad (2013) – Berosu
Tenkai Knights (2014) – Beni
Marvel Disk Wars: The Avengers (2014) – Mystique
Go! Princess PreCure (2015) – Minami Kaido/Cure Mermaid
Triage X (2015) – Miki Tsurugi
Seiyu's Life! (2015) – Herself
Beyblade Burst (2016) – Chiharu Aoi
Keijo (2016) – Kyoko Shirayuki (episodes 6 & 7)
Kemono Friends (2017) – Campo Flicker (episode 10, 12)
Dragon Ball Super (2017) – Cocoa Amaguri (episodes 73 & 74), Xeres
Tonikaku Kawaii (2020) – Kanoka Yuzaki (episode 8)
Dragon Goes House-Hunting (2021) – Lilith (episode 6)
Shin Ikki Tousen (2022) – Hakufu Sonsaku
RWBY: Ice Queendom (2022) – Glynda Goodwitch

Original video animations (OVAs)
A Little Snow Fairy Sugar (2003) – Saga
Eiken (2003) – Kirika Misono
Uta∽Kata (2005) – Manatsu Kuroki
Kowarekake no Orgel (2009) – Flower
Kase-san and Morning Glories (2018) – Sensei
Ikki Tousen: Western Wolves (2019) – Hakufu Sonsaku

Theatrical animation
Saint Seiya: Legend of Sanctuary (2014) – Scorpio Milo
Pretty Cure All Stars: Spring Carnival (2015) - Minami Kaido/Cure Mermaid
Go! Princess Precure the Movie: Go! Go!! Splendid Triple Feature!!! (2015) - Minami Kaido/Cure Mermaid
Pretty Cure All Stars: Singing with Everyone Miraculous Magic! (2016) - Minami Kaido/Cure Mermaid
Pretty Cure Dream Stars! (2017) - Minami Kaido/Cure Mermaid
Hugtto! PreCure Futari wa Pretty Cure: All Stars Memories (2018) - Minami Kaido/Cure Mermaid
Psycho-Pass: Sinners of the System (2019) - Risa Aoyanagi

Video games
.hack (–2005) – BlackRose (Hayami Akira)
Symphonic Rain – Falsita Fawcett
Summon Night: Swordcraft Story 2 – Torris
Tales of Legendia – Chloe Valens
Critical Velocity - Clara
Soulcalibur III – Tira
.hack//G.U. (–2007, 2017) – Alkaid (Youkou)
Mobile Suit Gundam: MS Sensen 0079 – Lil Somas
Bleach: The 3rd Phantom – Matsuri Kudo
Soulcalibur IV – Tira
Soulcalibur: Broken Destiny – Tira
beatmania IIDX 17 SIRIUS – Nyah
The Legend of Heroes: Trails from Zero – Noel Seeker
The Legend of Heroes: Trails to Azure (2011) – Noel Seeker
Valkyria Chronicles III – Imca
Rune Factory: Tides of Destiny – Odette
Growlanser IV: Wayfarer of Time – Eliza
Soulcalibur V – Tira
Project X Zone – BlackRose, Imca
Dynasty Warriors 8 – Zhang Chunhua
Toukiden: The Age of Demons ( – Ouka
Dragon Ball Xenoverse – Time Patroller (Female 1)
Digimon Story: Cyber Sleuth – Makiko Date
Super Robot Taisen OG: The Moon Dwellers – Calvina Coulange
Dragon Ball Xenoverse 2 – Time Patroller (Female 1)
Warriors All-Stars – Ouka
Digimon Story: Cyber Sleuth - Hacker's Memory – Makiko Date
 Food Fantasy (2018) – Foie Gras, Crepe, Hawthorne Ball
 Soulcalibur VI – Tira
 Kingdom Hearts III (2019) - GoGo Tomago
Valkyrie Connect – Völva, Avencia.

Misc.
Amai Tsumi no Kajitsu drama CD – Kurihara
Special A drama CD – Hikari Hanazono
Exit Trance – KANA (Music Series)
Wild Arms 3 Drama CD - Virginia Maxwell
7th Dragon III Code: VFD Drama CD - Nagiri

Dubbing roles

Live-action
47 Meters Down – Lisa (Mandy Moore)
Bloodshot – KT (Eiza González)
Dark Phoenix – Vuk (Jessica Chastain)
A Discovery of Witches – Gillian Chamberlain (Louise Brealey)
Extant – Julie Gelineau (Grace Gummer)
The Gilded Age – Bertha Russell (Carrie Coon)
Gone – Jill Conway (Amanda Seyfried)
A Good Man - Lena (Iulia Verdes)
How to Get Away with Murder – Laurel Castillo (Karla Souza)
Mr. Moll and the Chocolate Factory – Fritz (Maxwell Mare)
Peter Rabbit 2: The Runaway – Mittens
Pirates of the Caribbean: Dead Men Tell No Tales – Shansa (Golshifteh Farahani)
San Andreas – Blake Gaines (Alexandra Daddario)
Triloquist – Angelina (Paydin LoPachin)
The Wedding Ringer – Gretchen Palmer (Kaley Cuoco)

Animation
The Adventures of Jimmy Neutron: Boy Genius – Cindy Vortex
Big Hero 6 – GoGo Tomago
The Looney Tunes Show  – Tina Russo
RWBY – Glynda Goodwitch
Wonder Park – Greta

Books
Asano wrote a children's book series.
, illustrated by You Shiina (3 volumes, February 2009 - December 2010, Kadokawa Shoten)

Awards 
the Best Radio Personality in the 1st Seiyu Awards (2007)
the Highest Prize of Children's story category in the 13th Ohisama Taisho (2007)

References

 Taniguchi, Hiroshi et al. "The Official Art of Canvas2 ~Nijiiro no Sketch~". (November 2006) Newtype USA. pp. 101–107.

External links 
 
 
Masumi Asano at the Seiyuu database

1977 births
Living people
Aoni Production voice actors
Arts Vision voice actors
Japanese women pop singers
Japanese radio personalities
Japanese video game actresses
Japanese voice actresses
Kokugakuin University alumni
Musicians from Akita Prefecture
People from Noshiro, Akita
20th-century Japanese actresses
21st-century Japanese actresses
21st-century Japanese singers
21st-century Japanese women singers
Voice actresses from Akita Prefecture